The Tiflis Governorate was a province (guberniya) of the Caucasus Viceroyalty of the Russian Empire with its administrative center in Tiflis (present-day Tbilisi). In 1897, it constituted 44,607 sq. kilometres in area and had a population of 1,051,032 inhabitants. The Tiflis Governorate bordered the Elizavetpol Governorate to the southeast, the Erivan Governorate to the south, the Kars Oblast to the southwest, the Batum Oblast to the west, the Kutaisi Governorate to the northwest, the Terek Oblast to the north, the Dagestan Oblast to the northeast, and after 1905, the Zakatal Okrug to the east. The governorate covered areas of central and southeastern Georgia, the partially recognised state of South Ossetia, most of the Lori Province of Armenia, small parts of northwestern Azerbaijan, and a minuscule southern part of Ingushetia within Russia.

History 
Tiflis Governorate was established in 1846 along with the Kutaisi Governorate, after the dissolution of the Georgia-Imeretia Governorate. It was initially formed from uezds of Tiflis, Gori, Telavi, Signakh, Elizavetpol, Erivan, Nakhichevan and Alexandropol and the okrugs of Zakatal, Ossetian and Tushino-Pshavo-Khevsurian. In 1849, uezds of Erivan, Nakhichevan and Alexandropol were attached to Erivan Governorate. In 1859, the Ossetian Okrug became part of Gori district and Tushino-Pshavo-Khevsurian Okrug was renamed to Tionety Okrug. In 1867, the northern part of Tiflis uezd was separated into the Dusheti uezd, while Akhaltsikhe uezd which was created after ceding from Ottoman Empire to Russian Empire in 1829, was detached from Kutaisi Governorate and part of Tiflis one. In 1868 Elizavetpol uezd (in the same decree, the Kazakh uezd was formed from it) became a part of the Elizavetpol Governorate. In 1874, the southern part of Akhaltsikhe uezd became the Akhalkalaki uezd, and the Tionety okrug was elevated to an uezd. Finally, the southern part of Tiflis uezd was detached to become the Borchaly uezd.

The Tiflis Governorate lasted within these boundaries for some 50 years until the Russian Revolution and subsequent founding of the Democratic Republic of Georgia in 1918. The governorate and its counties were soon abolished after its incorporation into the Soviet Union and reorganised into the raions (counties) of the Georgian SSR by 1930.

Administrative divisions
The counties (uezds) of the Tiflis Governorate in 1917 were as follows:

Demographics

Russian Empire Census 
The plurality of the population indicated Georgian to be their mother tongue, with significant Armenian, Tatar, Russian, and Ossetian speaking minorities.

Kavkazskiy kalendar 

Governors 
The administration tasks in the governorate were executed by a governor. Sometimes, a military governor was appointed as well. The governors of Tiflis Governorate were
1847–1849 Sergei Nikolayevich Yermolov, governor;
1849–1855 Ivan Malkhazovich Andronnikov (Andronikashvili), military governor;
1855–1857 Nikolay Yevgenyevich Lukash, military governor;
1858–1860 Alexander Khristianovich Kapger, military governor;
1860–1876 Konstantin Ivanovich Orlovsky, governor;
1876–1878 Maximilian von der Osten-Sacken, governor; 
1878–1883 Konstantin Dmitriyevich Gagarin, governor; 
1883–1887 Alexander Ignatyevich Grosman, governor; 
1887–1889 Karl Leo Sissermann, governor; 
1889–1897 Georgy Dmitriyevich Shervashidze (Giorgi Shervashidze), governor; 
1897–1899 Fyodor Alexandrovich Bykov, governor; 
1899–1905 Ivan Nikolayevich Svechin, governor;
1905–1907 Paul Bernhard Demetrius Rausch von Traubenberg, governor;
1907–1911 Mikhail Alexandrovich Lyubich-Yarmolovich-Lozina-Lozinsky, governor;
1911–1914 Andrei Gavrilovich Chernyavsky, governor;
1914–1916 Ivan Mikhaylovich Strakhovsky, governor;
1916–1917 Alexander Nikolayevich Mandrika, acting governor.

Notes

References

Bibliography

Further reading
 
 

 
Caucasus Viceroyalty (1801–1917)
Governorates of the Caucasus
History of Tbilisi
Modern history of Georgia (country)
.
1900s in Georgia (country)
1910s in Georgia (country)
States and territories established in 1847
States and territories disestablished in 1917
1840s establishments in Georgia (country)
1917 disestablishments in Georgia (country)
1847 establishments in the Russian Empire
1917 disestablishments in Russia